Bosnia and Herzegovina wine is wine made in the Balkan country of Bosnia and Herzegovina.

Bosnia and Herzegovina vineyards are located in the southern regions of the country, with production focused in the area south of Mostar around the towns of Čitluk, Međugorje, Ljubuški, and Čapljina. Bosnian wines are made from a wide range of grape varieties including Blatina, Žilavka and Vranac.

The Tvrdoš Monastery near the city of Trebinje is renowned for its wine production and its wine cellars, one of which dates to the 15th century, which are a popular tourist attraction.

References

External links
Bosnia-Herzegovina – at the crossroads - Jancis Robinson

Bosnia and Herzegovina cuisine